Thérèse Steinmetz (born 17 May 1933) is a Dutch singer, best known for her participation in the 1967 Eurovision Song Contest.

Early career 

Steinmetz studied at the Conservatorium van Amsterdam, and appeared in various theatre, television and film roles before being give her own TV series, Thérèse, in 1966

Eurovision Song Contest 

In 1967, Steinmetz sang all six songs in the Dutch Eurovision selection, with "Ring-dinge-ding" being chosen by postcard voting as the winner. Steinmetz went forward to the 12th Eurovision Song Contest, held in Vienna on 8 April, where "Ring-dinge-ding" ended the evening in 14th place of 17 entries, continuing a run of poor Dutch results dating back to 1960.

Later career 
In 1970, Steinmetz won the Golden Stag Festival in Braşov, Romania, beating another former Eurovision singer, Lize Marke, into second place. The victory led to her becoming a very popular singer in Romania, which she would visit several times, performing a folk music-based repertoire.  She had a top 40 hit, "Geef ze een kans", in the Netherlands in 1974 and made regular television appearances.

Steinmetz has lived for many years in the French Riviera city of Cannes, where she has become a successful painter and owns and runs an art gallery and workshop.

References

External links 
 1967 page at Dingadong.nl (Dutch)
  Thérèse Steinmetz workshop & gallery

1933 births
Living people
Eurovision Song Contest entrants for the Netherlands
Dutch women singers
Eurovision Song Contest entrants of 1967
Musicians from Amsterdam
Dutch women painters
Dutch expatriates in France